Zemmour is a surname. Notable people with the surname include:

 Éric Zemmour (born 1958), French writer, journalist and politician
 Freddy Zemmour (born 1942), French footballer

See also
 Beni Zemmour, Moroccan tribe
 Guelta Zemmur, town in Western Sahara
 Tiris Zemmour Region, region of Mauritania
 Zemmoura, town in Algeria